Francis Hatch Kimball (September 24, 1845 – December 20, 1919) was an American architect practicing in New York City, best known for his work on skyscrapers in lower Manhattan and terra-cotta ornamentation. He was an associate with the firm Kimball & Thompson. His work includes the Empire Building, Manhattan Life Insurance Building, and Casino Theatre. All but one of Kimball's work was in the United States.

Life
Kimball was born in Kennebunk, Maine. He went on to study architecture in England.  In 1879 he joined forces with Thomas Wisedell, with whom he designed the 1882 Casino Theatre on Broadway, and other projects.  Wisedell died in 1884.  Kimball practiced independently until 1892, when he formed Kimball & Thompson with G. Kramer Thompson.  That partnership ended in 1898.

Kimball's Victorian Gothic Catholic Apostolic Church in New York City (1897) was praised by influential architectural critic Montgomery Schuyler as there being "no more scholarly Gothic work in New York."  Kimball was also a pioneer in the use of ornamental terra-cotta in the United States, evident on the Corbin Building; on a striking row of townhouses that he designed at 133–143 West 122nd Street in Harlem; and on the Montauk Club in Park Slope, Brooklyn. Contemporaries described Kimball as the "father of the skyscraper".

A 1917 article in The New York Times noted his bankruptcy. Kimball died in 1919 in New York City and buried at Linwood Cemetery in Haverhill, Essex County, Massachusetts.

Works before 1892

 26 Broadway (1885), Manhattan, New York; later extensively renovated
 Emmanuel Baptist Church (1887), NW corner of Lafayette Ave and St. James Place, Brooklyn, New York 
 Corbin Building (1888), Manhattan, New York
 Reading Company freight depot (1888), 260 Willow Street, Trenton, New Jersey
 133–143 West 122nd Street townhouses in Harlem, Manhattan, New York
 The Garrick Theater (1890; razed 1932), 67 West 35th Street, Manhattan, New York
 The Montauk Club (1891) Park Slope, Brooklyn, New York
 The Reading Terminal Headhouse (1891–93), Philadelphia, Pennsylvania; housed the offices of the Reading Railroad.
 Fifth Avenue Theatre (1892; razed 1939), 31 West 28th Street Manhattan, New York
 Victorian residence (1889–1890), 2 Mecklenburg Street at Sydney Street, Saint John, New Brunswick; for Robert Thompson Jr (owner of shipping company William Thompson and Company)

Works as part of Kimball & Thompson (1892–1898)

From 1892 to 1898, he was part of Kimball & Thompson which built:

New York Architectural Terra-Cotta Works Building (1892), 42-16 Vernon Boulevard, Queens, New York
 The Empire Building (1895), 71 Broadway, Manhattan, New York
 Manhattan Life Insurance Building (1894; demolished 1930), 64–70 Broadway, Manhattan, New York
The former Catholic Apostolic Church (1897), 417 West 57th Street, Manhattan, New York; now the Lutheran Church for All Nations.

Works after 1898
 111 Fifth Avenue (1904), Manhattan, New York; a "21-sty limestone and brick office building, 41.3×264.5 and irregular," for  $1,250,000.00.
 513–515 West 161st Street (1905), Manhattan, New York; a "3-sty brk and stone engine house", for the city of NY at a cost of $62,000. – now FDNY Hook & Ladder 34/Engine 34
 (with Harry E. Donnell) Brunswick Building (1906), Manhattan, New York; Beaux-Arts building located on the site of the former Brunswick Hotel at 225 Fifth Avenue, on Madison Square Park
 Mills Buildings (1906), SE corner of William Street, Manhattan, New York; an "11-sty brick and stone bank and office building" for J. & W. Seligman & Co. at a cost of $500,000.
 111 Broadway (1906), SW corner of Broadway and Cedar Street, Manhattan, New York; a "21-sty brick and stone office building," for  $3,000,000.00.
 City Investing Building,(1906–1908; razed 1968) 56 Cortlandt Street, Manhattan, New York; 26-story skyscraper built near the Singer Tower
 37 Wall Street (1906–1907), Manhattan, New York; commissioned for the Trust Company of America. Now residential building with Tiffany & Co as main floor tenant
 142 Liberty Street (1909), Manhattan, New York; a "3-sty and basement brick and reinforced concrete store and loft building" for A. L. White and F. M. Hilton of 62 Cedar St, at a cost of $15,000.
 224 West 57th Street (1909), Broadway and 57th St, Manhattan, New York; two 9-story automobile showrooms.
 66 57th St and Broadway (1909), Manhattan, New York; a "9-sty and basement concrete and brick garage" for $175,000.
 Broadway and the SE corner of Astor Place (1910), Manhattan, New York; a "2-sty brick and stone loft, slag roof, copper skylights, wire glass, copper cornices, terra cotta blocks, steam heat, doors fireproofed, metal sash and frames, fireproof trim, limestone" for $300,000.
 The Adams Express Buildings (1912), Manhattan, New York; Nos. 57–61 Broadway and Nos. 33–41 Trinity Place, a 32-story office building for $2 million.

References

External links
 Casino Theatre, New York, N.Y. (graphic). Held by the Department of Drawings & Archives, Avery Architectural & Fine Arts Library, Columbia University.

1845 births
1919 deaths
Architects from New York City
People from Kennebunk, Maine
American ecclesiastical architects
Gothic Revival architects
19th-century American architects
20th-century American architects